Walter Rayburn McClure (August 24, 1892 – April 12, 1959) was an American middle-distance runner who competed at the 1912 Summer Olympics. He finished eighth the 1500 m event and failed to reach the 800 m final. He also took part in the baseball event which was held as demonstration sport.

References

1890s births
1962 deaths
American male middle-distance runners
Baseball players from Oregon
Olympic track and field athletes of the United States
Olympic baseball players of the United States
Athletes (track and field) at the 1912 Summer Olympics
Baseball players at the 1912 Summer Olympics
People from Junction City, Oregon